Leipers Creek is a stream in the U.S. state of Tennessee, a tributary of the Duck River.

Leipers Creek has the name of Hugh Leiper, a pioneer settler.

See also
List of rivers of Tennessee

References

Rivers of Williamson County, Tennessee
Rivers of Maury County, Tennessee
Rivers of Tennessee